Chania is a constituency of the Hellenic Parliament. It comprises the Chania Prefecture, and is one of the four constituencies of Crete. It elects four members of Parliament.

Election results

Legislative election

Members of Parliament

Current members
Giorgos Stathakis   SYRIZA
Pavlos Polakis  SYRIZA
Valia Vagionaki  SYRIZA
Antonis Balomenakis  SYRIZA

Members (Jan 2015-Sep 2015)
Giorgos Stathakis   SYRIZA
Pavlos Polakis  SYRIZA
Valia Vagionaki  SYRIZA
Stavros Theodorakis  The River

Members (Jun 2012-Jan 2015) 
 Christos Markogiannakis ND
 Manousos Voloudakis ND
 Kyriakos Virvidakis ND
 Giorgos Stathakis SYRIZA

References

Parliamentary constituencies of Greece
Chania (regional unit)